The 2021 State of Origin series was the 40th annual best-of-three series between the Queensland and New South Wales rugby league teams. Before this series, Queensland has won 22 times, NSW 15 times, with two series drawn.

The venue for Game 1 was originally named as the Melbourne Cricket Ground, however, due to a COVID-19 outbreak in Melbourne during the lead up to the match, it was relocated to Queensland Country Bank Stadium in Townsville. Game 2 was played at Suncorp Stadium as scheduled. Game 3 was originally scheduled to be played at Stadium Australia in Sydney, however was moved, firstly, to McDonald Jones Stadium in Newcastle due to the deteriorating COVID-19 situation in Sydney, before being relocated again, to Cbus Super Stadium in Gold Coast.
These relocations meant that the series was the first entirely staged in a single state and the first games held in both Townsville and on the Gold Coast.

Game I

Game II

Game III

Player debuts

Game 1 

  Cap no. 293, Jarome Luai
  Cap no. 294, Brian To'o
  Cap no. 295, Liam Martin

  Cap no. 218, Kyle Feldt

Game 2 

  Cap no. 219, Francis Molo

Game 3 
  Cap no. 296, Mitchell Moses
 Cap no. 297, Apisai Koroisau

  Cap no. 220, Hamiso Tabuai-Fidow
  Cap no. 221, Thomas Flegler

Women's State of Origin

References 

State of Origin series